Parliamentary elections were held in Bulgaria on 22 December 1957. Voters were presented with a single list from the Fatherland Front, dominated by the Bulgarian Communist Party. As the Fatherland Front was the only organisation to contest the election and all candidate lists had to be approved by the Front, voters only had the option of voting for or against the Front list. Only 2,076 of the 5,206,103 valid votes were cast against. Voter turnout was reportedly 99.8%.

Results

References

Bulgaria
1957 in Bulgaria
Parliamentary elections in Bulgaria
One-party elections
1957 elections in Bulgaria
December 1957 events in Europe